Mingus Ah Um is a studio album by American jazz musician Charles Mingus which was released in October 1959 by Columbia Records. It was his first album recorded for Columbia. The cover features a painting by S. Neil Fujita. The title is a corruption of an imaginary Latin declension. It is common for Latin students to memorize Latin adjectives by first saying the masculine nominative (usually ending in "-us"), then the feminine nominative ("-a"), and finally the neuter nominative singular ("-um")—implying a transformation of his name, Mingus, Minga, Mingum. The album was inducted into the Grammy Hall of Fame in 2013.

Composition
The Penguin Guide to Jazz on CD calls this album "an extended tribute to ancestors" (and awards it one of their rare crowns), and Mingus's musical forebears figure largely throughout. "Better Git It In Your Soul" is inspired by gospel singing and preaching of the sort that Mingus would have heard as a child growing up in Watts, Los Angeles, California, while "Goodbye Pork Pie Hat" is a reference (by way of his favored headgear) to saxophonist Lester Young (who had died shortly before the album was recorded). The origin and nature of "Boogie Stop Shuffle" is self-explanatory: a twelve-bar blues with four themes and a boogie bass backing that passes from stop time to shuffle and back.

"Self-Portrait in Three Colors" was originally written for John Cassavetes' first film as director, Shadows, but was never used (for budgetary reasons). "Open Letter to Duke" is a tribute to Duke Ellington, and draws on three of Mingus's earlier pieces ("Nouroog", "Duke's Choice", and "Slippers"). "Jelly Roll" is a reference to jazz pioneer and pianist Jelly Roll Morton and features a quote of Sonny Rollins' "Sonnymoon for Two" during Horace Parlan's piano solo. "Bird Calls", in Mingus's own words, was not a reference to bebop saxophonist Charlie "Bird" Parker: "It wasn't supposed to sound like Charlie Parker. It was supposed to sound like birds – the first part."

"Fables of Faubus" is named after Orval E. Faubus (1910–1994), the Governor of Arkansas infamous for his 1957 stand against integration of Little Rock, Arkansas schools in defiance of U.S. Supreme Court rulings (forcing President Eisenhower to send in the National Guard). Columbia Records refused to allow the lyrics to the song to be included, and so the song was recorded as an instrumental on the album. It was not until October 20, 1960, that the song was recorded with lyrics, for the album Charles Mingus Presents Charles Mingus, which was released on the more independent Candid label. Due to contractual issues with Columbia, the song could not be released as "Fables of Faubus", and so the Candid version was titled "Original Faubus Fables".

Edited and unedited versions
The original Columbia Records LP release of the album featured edited versions of six of the nine compositions. For these tracks, from one to three minutes of the performances were removed, both to meet the playing time constraints of the LP format, and because producer Teo Macero felt the pieces were more effective in edited form. Unedited versions of these pieces were first released in 1979, on LP. The first widely-available CD edition of the album, 1987's "Columbia Jazz Masterpieces" edition, used the original LP edits. The edited version has been reissued on compact disc subsequent to 1987, including a 2019 release by Mobile Fidelity Sound Lab. The unedited version of the album was first widely released on compact disc in 1998 as part of the Sony Legacy series, and it too has remained available through additional compact disc reissues.

Reception

Mingus Ah Um was one of fifty recordings chosen by the Library of Congress to be added to the National Recording Registry in 2003. The album was ranked number 380 of the Top 500 Albums of All-Time by Rolling Stone in 2020.

50th anniversary reissue
In 2009, Sony's Legacy Recordings released a special 2-disc 50th Anniversary Edition of Mingus Ah Um. In addition to the complete album, the Legacy Edition includes an alternative take of each of three tracks: "Bird Calls" (4:54), "Better Git It In Your Soul" (8:30), and "Jelly Roll" (6:41).  The Legacy Edition of Mingus Ah Um also includes Mingus Dynasty, its companion album recorded later in 1959 (with unedited versions of five tracks shortened on the original LP release).

Track listing
All tracks composed by Charles Mingus, except "Girl of My Dreams", composed by Sunny Clapp.

Notes
When Columbia first issued the album in 1959, six of the album's nine tracks (tracks 2, 3, 5, 6, 8 and 9) were shortened in order to fit them on the LP. These six tracks were first restored in 1979 and three other recordings were discovered. Later reissues contain both the full-length versions of the original nine tracks and the three new tracks; some reissues retain the 1959 truncated versions.
 Tracks 1, 6, 7, 8, 9 and 10 recorded on May 5, 1959; tracks 2, 3, 4, 5, 11 and 12 recorded on May 12, 1959. All tracks recorded at Columbia 30th Street Studio, New York City.

Personnel
 John Handy – alto sax (1, 6, 7, 9, 10, 11, 12), clarinet (8), tenor sax (2)
 Booker Ervin – tenor sax
 Shafi Hadi – tenor sax (2, 3, 4, 7, 8, 10), alto sax (1, 5, 6, 9, 12)
 Willie Dennis – trombone (3, 4, 5, 12)
 Jimmy Knepper – trombone (1, 7, 8, 9, 10)
 Horace Parlan – piano
 Charles Mingus – bass, piano (with Parlan on track 10)
 Dannie Richmond – drums

Certifications

References

 Priestley, Brian. Sleeve notes to 1998 reissue of Mingus Ah Um (Columbia CK 65512)

External links
 

1959 albums
Charles Mingus albums
United States National Recording Registry recordings
Albums produced by Teo Macero
Columbia Records albums
Albums recorded at CBS 30th Street Studio
Grammy Hall of Fame Award recipients
Album covers by S. Neil Fujita
United States National Recording Registry albums